Mount Nemrut or Nemrud (Greek: Όρος Νεμρούτ) is a  mountain in southeastern Turkey, notable for the summit where a number of large statues are erected around what is assumed to be a royal tomb from the 1st century BC. It is one of the highest peaks in the east of the Taurus Mountains.

It was added to the UNESCO World Heritage Site in 1987. The entry states:

Location and description

In 62 BC, King Antiochus I Theos of Commagene built on the mountain top a tomb-sanctuary flanked by huge statues  of himself, two lions, two eagles, and various composite Greek and Iranian gods, such as Heracles-Artagnes-Ares, Zeus-Oromasdes, and Apollo-Mithras-Helios-Hermes. When constructing this pantheon, Antiochus drew heavily from Parthian and Armenian traditions in order to reinvigorate the religion of his ancestral dynasty. The statues were once seated, with names of each god inscribed on them. At some point the heads of the statues were removed from their bodies, and they are now scattered throughout the site.

The pattern of damage to the heads (notably to noses) suggests that they were deliberately damaged as a result of iconoclasm. The statues have not been restored to their original places. The site also preserves stone slabs with bas-relief figures that are thought to have formed a large frieze. These slabs, or stelae, depict Antiochus' Greek and Persian ancestors.

It is possible that the tumulus of loose rock was devised to protect a tomb from robbers, since any excavation would quickly fill in. The statues appear to have Greek-style faces, but Persian clothing and hair-styling.

The western terrace contains a large slab with a lion, showing an arrangement of stars and the planets Jupiter, Mercury, and Mars. The composition was taken to be a chart of the sky on 7 July 62 BCE. This may be an indication of when construction began on this monument. The eastern portion is well preserved, being composed of several layers of rock, and a path following the base of the mountain is evidence of a walled passageway linking the eastern and western terraces. Possible uses for this site are thought to have included religious ceremonies, owing to the astronomical and religious nature of the monument.

The arrangement of such statues is known by the term hierothesion. Similar arrangements have been found at Arsameia on Nymphaios at the hierothesion of Antiochus' father, Mithridates I Callinicus.

Ancient history 
The religious sanctuary established in Mount Nemrut was part of Antiochus' political program to revive the Persian traditions of Commagene. In order to do so, he merged and adjusted the political and religious traditions of Cappadocia, Pontus, and Armenia.

Following the practice of the Mithridatic rulers of Pontus, Antiochus stressed his descent from the Achaemenids and Seleucids, and also claimed the royal legacy of Armenia. One of the essential parts of this identity was the then newly established Greco-Iranian pantheon, which was worshipped at specific sanctuaries in Commagene.

Modern history
After her first visit in 1947, Theresa Goell dedicated her life to the site, starting campaigns in 1954. Subsequent excavations have failed to reveal the tomb of Antiochus. This is nevertheless still believed to be the site of his burial. The statues, all of them "beheaded", have not been restored to their original condition.

World Heritage Site
In 1987, Mount Nemrut was made a World Heritage Site by UNESCO. Tourists typically visit Nemrut during April through October. The nearby town of Adıyaman is a popular place for car and bus trips to the site, and one can also travel from there by helicopter. There are also overnight tours running out of Malatya or Kahta.

Gallery

See also
 Cities of the ancient Near East
 List of megalithic sites
 List of colossal sculptures in situ
 Queen of the Mountain — 2005 documentary about the excavation of Mount Nemrut

References

Sources 
 
 

 
 
 
 

 
 Brijder, Herman A.G. (ed.) (2014), Nemrud Dağı: Recent Archaeological Research and Conservation Activities in the Tomb Sanctuary on Mount Nemrud. Walter de Gruyter, Boston/Berlin,

External links 

 
  Mt. Nemrut
 International Nemrud Foundation
 Commagene Nemrut Conservation and Development Program

Commagene
Mountains of Turkey
National parks of Turkey
62 BC
Landforms of Adıyaman Province
Tourist attractions in Adıyaman Province
History of Adıyaman Province
Historic sites in Turkey
Nimrod
Important Bird Areas of Turkey
Archaeological sites in Turkey